Posht Kabud may refer to:
 Posht Kabud, Ilam
 Posht Kabud, Kermanshah